Kilburnia is a genus of sea snails, marine gastropod mollusks in the family Fasciolariidae, the spindle snails, the tulip snails and their allies.

Species
Species within the genus Kilburnia include:
 Kilburnia agulhasensis (Tomlin, 1932)
 Kilburnia alfredensis (Bartsch, 1915)
 Kilburnia dunkeri (Strebel, 1911)
 Kilburnia heynemanni (Dunker, 1870)
 Kilburnia scholvieni (Strebel, 1911)
 Kilburnia strebeli (Fulton, 1930)

References

 Snyder M.A., Vermeij G.J. & Lyons W.G. (2012) The genera and biogeography of Fasciolariinae (Gastropoda, Neogastropoda, Fasciolariidae). Basteria 76(1-3): 31-70

Fasciolariidae